Ryan Perryman (born April 13, 1976) is a retired American expatriate basketball player who spent time playing professionally in Hungary, South Korea, Chile, the Dominican Republic and Argentina. He is best remembered, however, for his collegiate career at the University of Dayton between 1994–95 and 1997–98. Perryman played for the Flyers after attending Oak Park High School in Oak Park, Michigan. As a senior in 1997–98, Perryman led NCAA Division I in rebounding with a 12.5 per game average. He holds the school records for rebounds in a game (23) and offensive rebounds in a season (166).

Perryman did not get selected in the NBA Draft  but had tryouts with the Milwaukee Bucks and Sacramento Kings.  Perryman came out of college in 1998, the year of the NBA lockout so tryouts with teams were cut short.  He then went on to  spend his first year out of college as a teacher in Michigan before becoming a professional basketball player. He had the most success while playing for Argentino de Junín in Buenos Aires. He led the Argentine league in rebounding every single season he was there and even developed a cult following among the team's fans.  He also played briefly in the Continental Basketball Association for the Grand Rapids Hoops during the 1998–99 season, averaging 3 points and 5 rebounds per game in limited action.

Today he is a district sales manager for Houghton Mifflin Harcourt. He lives in Columbus, Ohio, and is married with 3 children.

See also
List of NCAA Division I men's basketball season rebounding leaders

References

1977 births
Living people
American expatriate basketball people in Argentina
American expatriate basketball people in Chile
American expatriate basketball people in Hungary
American expatriate basketball people in South Korea
American expatriate basketball people in the Dominican Republic
Basketball players from Michigan
Dayton Flyers men's basketball players
Grand Rapids Hoops players
People from Oak Park, Michigan
Power forwards (basketball)
Basketball players from Columbus, Ohio
American men's basketball players